Robert Buell may refer to:
 Robert Anthony Buell (1940–2002), American murderer
 Robert C. Buell (born 1931), American politician

See also
 Buell (disambiguation)